Naël Jaby (born 20 April 2001) is a French professional footballer who plays as a midfielder for Championnat National 2 club Moulins Yzeure on loan from Clermont.

Club career 
Jaby began his career at US Vic-le-Comte in 2008, a year before joining Montferrand. In 2016, he joined the youth academy of Clermont. He started making appearances for the club's reserve side in the Championnat National 3 in the 2017–18 season. In the 2020–21 season, Jaby joined Austrian club Austria Lustenau on loan. He scored one goal and played twenty-one matches for the club in the 2. Liga before returning to his parent club. On 18 December 2021, Jaby made his senior debut for Clermont in a 4–0 Coupe de France win over Chemin Bas d'Avignon.

On 29 August 2022, Jaby joined Moulins Yzeure on a season-long loan.

International career 
Born in France, Jaby is of Algerian descent and holds both French and Algerian citizenship. He has represented France at under-18 and under-19 level.

Career statistics

References 

2001 births
Sportspeople from Clermont-Ferrand
Footballers from Auvergne-Rhône-Alpes
Living people
French footballers
Algerian footballers
French sportspeople of Algerian descent
Association football midfielders
AS Montferrand Football players
Clermont Foot players
SC Austria Lustenau players
Moulins Yzeure Foot players
Championnat National 3 players
2. Liga (Austria) players
France youth international footballers
French expatriate footballers
Expatriate footballers in Austria
French expatriate sportspeople in Austria